Víctor Víctor Mesa Ríos (born July 20, 1996) is a Cuban professional baseball outfielder in the Miami Marlins organization.

Career
Mesa played in the Cuban National Series for Matanzas from 2012 through 2017, and for Industriales in the 2017–18 season. Mesa played for the Cuban national team at the 2017 World Baseball Classic. Mesa and his younger brother, Víctor Mesa Jr., defected from Cuba in 2018.

On October 22, 2018, Mesa and his brother Víctor Jr. signed with the Miami Marlins. Mesa received a $5.25 million signing bonus. He began 2019 with the Jupiter Hammerheads, and was promoted to the Jacksonville Jumbo Shrimp on July 30. Between the two levels, Mesa hit a combined .235/.274/.263/.537 with no home runs and 29 runs batted in. Following the 2019 season Mesa played for the Salt River Rafters of the Arizona Fall League.

Personal life
His father, Víctor Mesa, was the manager of Cuba at the 2013 World Baseball Classic and is a former player. His brother Víctor Mesa Jr. is also an outfielder in the Miami organization.

References

External links

1996 births
Living people
People from Santa Clara, Cuba
Defecting Cuban baseball players
Baseball outfielders
Cocodrilos de Matanzas players
Industriales de La Habana players
2017 World Baseball Classic players
Jupiter Hammerheads players
Jacksonville Jumbo Shrimp players
Salt River Rafters players